Heinrich von Ficker (22 November 1881 – 29 April 1957) was a German-Austrian meteorologist and geophysicist who was a native of Munich. He was the son of historian Julius von Ficker (1826–1902).

Career
From 1911 he was a professor of meteorology at the University of Graz, and from 1923 to 1937 was a professor at the University of Berlin. During his tenure at Berlin, he also spent several years as director of the Prussian Meteorological Institute. From 1937 until his retirement in 1952, he was a professor at University of Vienna and director of the Zentralanstalt für Meteorologie und Geodynamik (Central Institute for Meteorology and Geodynamics) (ZAMG).

In 1906 and 1910, while based in Innsbruck, Ficker performed extensive scientific studies involving the dynamics of Alpine foehn winds. With biometeorologist Bernhard de Rudder (1894–1962), he was the author of the treatise Föhn und Föhnwirkungen (Foehn and Foehn Effects). Ficker was also responsible for important research of cold fronts and heat waves that occur in Russia and northern Asia.

References 
 Biography of Heinrich von Ficker (translated from German)

1881 births
1957 deaths
Austrian meteorologists
German geophysicists
Scientists from Munich
Academic staff of the University of Graz
Academic staff of the University of Vienna
Members of the German Academy of Sciences at Berlin
German emigrants to Austria-Hungary